Renaud III may refer to:

Renaud III, Count of Soissons (d. after 1141)
Reginald III, Count of Burgundy (c. 1093 – 1148)
Reginald III, Duke of Guelders (1333–1371)